The Bellman Prize is a literature prize for "an outstanding Swedish poet" awarded yearly by the Swedish Academy The prize was first  established by Anders Zorn  (1860-1920) and his wife Emma Lamm  (1860–1942). In 1920, they had established the 
Emma and Anders Zorn's Donation Fund Foundation. A donation from the foundation was used to fund the Swedish Academy-Bellman Prize.

See also
Carl Michael Bellman
Zorn Badge

References 

Swedish literary awards
Awards established in 1920
Carl Michael Bellman
Anders Zorn